Lower Ghaghri Falls  is located  from Netarhat in Latehar district in the Indian state of Jharkhand. It is the 33rd highest waterfall in India. It is known for its mesmerizing beauty and a major tourist attraction in Jharkhand.

This waterfall is situated on the Ghaghri River, tributary of Auranga River. The forest around the Lower Ghaghri Falls is so dense that even sun rays find it difficult to pierce through. The water falls from the height of 320 feet (98 m) from the cascade. The sound of falling water makes the surrounding musical.  The Upper Ghaghri Falls,  from Netarhat, is a smaller waterfall, below Netarhat Dam.

See also
List of waterfalls in India
List of waterfalls in India by height

References
 

Waterfalls of Jharkhand
Waterfalls of India